, formerly , was a Japanese publisher that specialized in light novels, manga, role-playing games and collectible card games. Founded in 1972 and reorganized three times, it was at times an independent company and at times an imprint of Kadokawa Future Publishing. It ceased to be an independent company in 2013, and the brand was retired in 2015.

Magazines published 
 Light novel magazines
 Fantasia Battle Royal
 Dragon Magazine (Fujimi Shobo)

 Manga magazines
 Monthly Dragon Age
 Dragon Age Pure
 Age Premium

Publishing labels 
 Active
 Fujimi Dragon Book (role-playing games)
 Fujimi Fantasia Bunko (light novels)
 Fujimi Mystery Bunko (mystery light novels)
 Fujimi L Bunko
Entertainment novel imprint that's aimed at an adult female audience (no adult content), and contains fantasy, gothic, mystery, etc... works. The stories don't stick to the literature and light novel frameworks. The "L" in the imprint's name is an initial for "Literature" and "Light Novel".
 Fujimi Shobo Novels
A light novel imprint that publishes web novel works from the novel contribution website "Shōsetsuka ni Narō" (小説家になろう) in tankoubon format. The label was aimed at a male audience.
 Kadokawa Books
A light novel imprint that focuses on the publication of web novel works in paper format with the addition of illustrations to them. It also publishes light novel adaptations of games. Entertainment fiction works are published under the imprint, especially web novels from User generated content websites such as "Shōsetsuka ni Narō" (小説家になろう). The label is aimed at a male audience. 

 Discontinued
 Oniroku Dan Bunko
 Fujimi Bishōjo Bunko
 Fujimi Bunko
 Fujimi Dragon Novels
 Fujimi Jidaishōsetsu Bunko
 Fujimi Roman Bunko
 Style-F

Role-playing games 
 Arianrhod RPG
 Demon Parasite
 GURPS (translated)
 Sword World RPG
 Sword World 2.0

Collectible card games 
 Dragon All-Stars
 Monster Collection
 Project Revolution

References

External links 
 

 
Card game publishing companies
Book publishing companies in Tokyo
Japanese role-playing games
Role-playing game publishing companies
Kadokawa Corporation subsidiaries
Magazine publishing companies in Tokyo
Publishing companies established in 1972
Japanese companies established in 1972
Comic book publishing companies in Tokyo